Dimitri Rassam (born 16 November 1981) is a Lebanese-French film producer and a member of the Monegasque princely family through marriage.

Background and education
Rassam is the son of actress Carole Bouquet and film producer Jean-Pierre Rassam. He has one half-brother, Louis, born in 1987 to his mother's relationship with the photographer Francis Giacobetti.

Rassam finished secondary school at École Active Bilingue with a Bac scientifique, then prepped at Sciences Po. He began work on a business degree at HEC Paris, but changed course to earn a degree in history (from the Sorbonne) instead.

Career
Dimitri Rassam founded the production company CHAPTER 2 in 2005. He has produced over 20 films, including The Little Prince (2015) by Mark Osborne (2016 César Awards for Best Animated Film and selected out-of-competition at the 68th Cannes Film Festival) and several very successful French films (What's in a Name?, Le Brio, Daddy or Mommy 1 and 2) that have also generated many international remakes.

He created the group On Entertainment in 2014, in association with Aton Soumache, which became one of Europe's leading companies in animation.

The company became part of the Mediawan group in 2018.

In 2020, Dimitri Rassam initiated with Pathé the production of the films The Three Musketeers (2023) by Martin Bourboulon starring François Civil, Vincent Cassel, Romain Duris, Pio Marmai, Eva Green, Louis Garrel, Vicky Krieps, Jacob Fortune-Lloyd, Lyna Khoudri etc. It is one of Europe's largest productions with a budget of 72M€ for a 150-day shoot. The movies are now in post-production and the films are expected to be released in Easter and Christmas of 2023. 

He also has recently completed Benjamin Millepied's first feature film CARMEN (2022) (starring Melissa Barrera, Paul Mescal, Rossy de Palma and The Doc), premiering at the 2022 Toronto International Film Festival. As well as Emanuele Crialese’s next film L'Immensità (2022) starring Penélope Cruz and premiering at the 79th Venice International Film Festival on September 4, 2022.  

He is currently producing Kirill Serebrennikov's first English-language film Limonov: the ballad of Eddie (2023) adapted from the novel by Emmanuel Carrère with Ben Wishaw as the leading role

Filmography
Rassam is credited as producer of the following films:

Films 

 2008 : Trouble at Timpetill  by Nicolas Bary
 2010 : Libre échange by Serge Gisquière
 2012 : What's in a Name? by Matthieu Delaporte and Alexandre De La Patellière - the film had five nominations at the 38th César Awards particularly in Best Film, winning in the categories Best Supporting Actress (Valérie Benguigui) and Best Supporting Actor (Guillaume de Tonquédec).
 2012 : Upside Down by Juan Solanas
 2012 : Bad Girl by Patrick Mille
 2013 : The Scapegoat by Nicolas Bary
 2013 : The Informant by Julien Leclercq
 2014 : Un illustre inconnu by Matthieu Delaporte
 2014 : Escobar: Paradise Lost by Andrea Di Stefano
 2015 : Mune: Guardian of the Moon by Benoît Philippon and Alexandre Heboyan
 2015 : Daddy or Mommy by Martin Bourboulon
 2015 : The Little Prince by Marks Osborne - for this film, Rassam, Aton Soumache, Alexis Vonarb, and Mark Osborne received the 2016 César Award for Best Animated Film.
 2016 : Going to Brazil by Patrick Mille
 2016 : Daddy or Mommy 2 by Martin Bourboulon
 2017 : Le Brio by Yvan Attal - the film was nominated at the 43rd César Awards for Best Film and Camélia Jordana received the 2018 César Award for Most Promising Actress.
 2019 : Play by Anthony Marciano
 2019 : Just a Gigolo by Olivier Baroux
 2019 : Playmobil: The Movie by Lino DiSalvo
 2019 : Our Lady of the Nile by Atiq Rahimi
 2019 : Le Meilleur reste à venir by Matthieu Delaporte et Alexandre de la Patellière
 2021 : Envole-moi by Christophe Barratier
 TBA : Carmen, by Benjamin Millepied
 2023 : L'Immensità by Emanuele Crialese
 TBA : Limonov : the ballad of Eddie by Kirill Serebrennikov
 2023 :The Three Musketeers : D'Artagnan (2023) by Martin Bourboulon
 2023 :The Three Musketeers : Milady (2023) by Martin Bourboulon

Short films 

 2006 : Judas (2006)

TV series 

 2012 : The Little Prince (one episode : The Planet of the Okidians)
 2011-2012 : Iron Man: Armored Adventures (15 episodes)

Personal life
He married Masha Novoselova in 2010. His daughter, Darya, was born in 2011. At the end of 2016, he separated from Novoselova and subsequently got divorced. In 2017, he began to date Charlotte Casiraghi. In March 2018, Rassam and Casiraghi were engaged. Their son, Balthazar, was born on 23 October 2018. Rassam and Casiraghi were wed at the Prince's Palace of Monaco on 1 June 2019. On 29 June 2019, they married religiously at Sainte-Marie de Pierredon Abbey, Saint-Rémy-de-Provence.

References

External links
 
 ON Animation Studios

1981 births
French film producers
Living people
University of Paris alumni
French people of Lebanese descent
French animated film producers